Lean into It is the second studio album by the American rock band Mr. Big, released on March 26, 1991. The band's breakthrough release, Lean into It peaked at number 15 on the Billboard 200 charts, while the single "To Be with You" became the band's first and only song to hit number 1 on the Billboard Hot 100. The follow-up single, "Just Take My Heart", was a top-20 hit, peaking at number 16 on the Billboard Hot 100.

"Daddy, Brother, Lover, Little Boy" features Gilbert and Sheehan running Makita cordless drills over their guitar strings in harmony to create an unusually fast solo which is likely not possible to replicate with hands. The "CDFF" prefix of the Jeff Paris-penned "Lucky This Time", is the song "Addicted to That Rush" from the band's 1989 eponymous debut album, played at a higher playback speed; hence the "CDFF" for "Compact Disc Fast Forward", "CDFF" is also the chord structure to the song.

The cover image is a picture from the Montparnasse train accident that occurred on October 22, 1895 in Gare Montparnasse station in Paris, France.

The album was ranked No. 49 on Rolling Stone's list of the 50 Greatest Hair Metal Albums of All Time.

The album includes the psychedelic rock song "Green-Tinted Sixties Mind".

Track listing

Personnel
Mr. Big
 Eric Martin – lead vocals, handclaps 
 Paul Gilbert – electric guitar, acoustic guitar, handclaps, backing vocals, electric drill
 Billy Sheehan – bass, six-string bass on "Just Take My Heart", handclaps, backing vocals, electric drill
 Pat Torpey – drums, percussion, handclaps, backing vocals

Production
 Kevin Elson – producer, engineer, mixing, 
 Tom Size – mixing
 Chris Kupper, David Lucke, Scott Ralston, Michael Semanick, Andy Udoff – assistant engineers
 Bob Ludwig – mastering at Masterdisk, New York
 William Holmes – photography
 Bob Defrin – art direction

Charts

Album

Singles

Certifications

References

Mr. Big (American band) albums
1991 albums
Atlantic Records albums
Albums produced by Kevin Elson